Amzy Merriam was a member of the Wisconsin State Assembly during the 1871 session. Merriam resided in Geneva, Wisconsin. He was a Republican.

References

External links
The Political Graveyard

People from Geneva, Wisconsin
Republican Party members of the Wisconsin State Assembly
Year of birth missing
Year of death missing